The 2020–21 New Zealand Football Championship season (currently known as the ISPS Handa Men's Premiership for sponsorship reasons) is the seventeenth season of the NZFC since its establishment in 2004. Eight teams compete in the competition with Auckland City and Team Wellington representing the ISPS Handa Men's Premiership in the 2021 OFC Champions League after Auckland City finished Premiers, with Team Wellington finishing regular season runners-up in the 2019–20 competition, after the remainder of the competition was cancelled mid-March due to the COVID-19 pandemic in New Zealand. The change from ten teams to eight teams was due to Tasman United and Southern United joining Canterbury United to form a united South Island team, playing under the Canterbury United name. Auckland City won the league with a game in hand, taking top spot for their 12th premiership.

Clubs

Regular season

League table

Positions by round

Fixtures and results
The season was scheduled to be played on a home and away basis between 14 November 2020 and 28 February 2021, with the finals series being played in March 2021. On 27 February 2021 it was announced that the game between Hawkes Bay United and Eastern Suburbs for Round 14 had been delayed because of a COVID-19 outbreak that resulted in the Auckland region moving to Level 3 and the rest of the country changing to Level 2. New Zealand Football announced that the game was to be rescheduled to be played as a midweek fixture sometime between 8–12 March but is dependant on the Alert Levels coming down. It was also announced that if the restrictions in Auckland remained, then the game would be cancelled and classed as a draw with both clubs sharing the points. If that was to happen, then the final top four teams for the semi-finals would be Auckland City, Team Wellington, Hamilton Wanderers and Waitakere United. This potentially could cause more issues, as two of the teams (Auckland City and Waitakere United) are based in the Auckland region so was also advised that in the event that the restrictions where still in place when the semi-finals where due to be played, then the competition would proceed to a straight final to be played between the two clubs that where top of the league at the end of the season. This would then see Auckland City and Team Wellington play the final, scheduled to be played on 21 March. With the restrictions in Auckland being lowered, the game was rescheduled and played on Wednesday 10 March 2021. The result of the game decided on who finished fourth and faced Auckland City for the second Semi-final.

Results table

All times are in New Zealand Time.

Round 1

Round 2

Round 3

Round 4

Round 5

Round 6

Round 7

Round 8

Round 9

Round 10

Round 11

Round 12

Round 13

Round 14

Finals series

Semi-finals

Grand final

Statistics

Top scorers

† Due to reaching 12 goals in less games, Hamish Watson was awarded the Golden Boot at the Grand finals.

Hat-tricks

Own goals

References

External links
 ISPS Handa Men's Premiership website 

New Zealand Football Championship seasons
2020–21 in New Zealand association football
New Zealand Football Championship
New Zealand Football Championship